Tarwater may refer to:

Tar water, a Medieval medicine
Tarwater (band), a German music duo
Tarwater Creek, a small river in San Mateo County, California, USA
Davis Tarwater (born 1984), American swimmer
Sean Tarwater (born 1969), American politician
Francis Tarwater, the main character in The Violent Bear It Away by Flannery O'Connor